The Hawthorne Smoke Shop (later known as the Ship) was a gambling casino owned by American gangster Al Capone and run by fellow gangsters Frankie Pope and Pete Penovich. It was located in Cicero, Illinois, where Capone had fled to escape Chicago police. Although shut down temporarily by raids several times during its existence, it provided a significant amount of revenue, earning half a million dollars in a two-year period. Leslie Shumway, a cashier who worked there, testified in court that horse betting, roulette, craps, blackjack, and birdcage (chuck-a-luck) all took place there. The profits from the Hawthorne Smoke Shop were one piece of evidence used against Capone at his trial in 1931.

Location
The Hawthorne Smoke Shop was located at 4835 W. 22nd St., in Cicero. It was in the same building as  the Alton Hotel.

References

Al Capone
Casinos in Illinois